Jack Anderson may refer to: 

Jack Anderson (columnist) (1922–2005), American newspaper columnist
Jack Anderson (cyclist) (born 1987), Australian road racing cyclist
Jack Anderson (dance critic) (born 1935), American poet, dance critic, and dance historian
Jack Anderson (figure skater) (born 1924), American ice dancer
Jack Z. Anderson (1904–1981), United States Representative from California
Jack Anderson (footballer, born 1908) (1908–1960), Australian rules footballer for Richmond and North Melbourne
Jack Anderson (footballer, born 1909) (1909–1982), Australian rules footballer for St Kilda
Jack Anderson (American football) (born 1998), American football player
Jack Anderson (racing driver), retired NASCAR Grand National Driver in 1964 Capital City 300
Jack E. Anderson (1929–1993), creator of oversized statues in the Midwestern United States
Jack R. Anderson, director of bands at the University of Pittsburgh
Jack Anderson (baseball) (born 1994), American baseball player

See also
John Anderson (disambiguation)